Charles W. Van De Mark House is a Queen Anne style historic building located in Clyde, Kansas, which is listed on the National Register of Historic Places.  It was listed in 1985.  It was deemed notable " local architectural significance as one of the most elaborate and best preserved of the late nineteenth-century houses of Clyde."

It was converted to use as a restaurant in 1979, but is now a private home.

Background
Charles W. Van De Mark was a prominent banker and attorney in Clyde, Kansas. He and his wife Elizabeth Stevens had three sons, Martin Van De Mark, Otis Van De Mark, and John V. Van De Mark. Martin was a very successful farmer in Kansas. Otis moved to Houston, Texas, where he had a successful business career. John V. Van De Mark went on to develop real estate in Houston with his uncle, Henry F. McGregor, as well as to serve as the Vice President of the Federal Land Bank in Houston.

History
The two-story house was built for Van De Mark's family. The house was furnished with the finest mahogany paneling and millwork, which exist to this day.

See also
 National Register of Historic Places listings in Cloud County, Kansas

References

Houses in Cloud County, Kansas
Houses on the National Register of Historic Places in Kansas
National Register of Historic Places in Cloud County, Kansas